In computing, a private message, personal message, or direct message (abbreviated as PM or DM) refers to a private communication sent or received by a user of a private communication channel on any given platform. Unlike public posts, PMs are only viewable by the participants. Though long a function present on IRCs and Internet forums, private channels for PMs have recently grown in popularity due to the increasing demand for privacy and private collaboration on social media.

There are two main types of private messages. One type includes those found on IRCs and Internet forums, as well as on social media apps like Twitter, Facebook, and Instagram, where the focus is public posting, PMs allow users to communicate privately without leaving the platform. The second type are those relayed through instant messaging platforms such as WhatsApp, Kik, and Snapchat, where users create accounts primarily to exchange PMs. A third type, peer-to-peer messaging, occurs when users create and own the infrastructure used to transmit and store the messages; while features vary depending on application, they give the user full control over the data they transmit. An example of software that enables this kind of messaging is Classified-ads.

Besides serving as a tool to connect privately with friends and family, PMs have gained momentum in the workplace. Working professionals use PMs to reach coworkers in other spaces and increase efficiency during meetings. Although useful, using PMs in the workplace may blur the boundary between work and private lives.

History

The development of computers sparked the information revolution, which changed the way people communicate. Peter Drucker published an article centering on the theme that the computer is to the Information Revolution what the railroad was to the Industrial Revolution; railroads unified travel between the east and west coast of the United States, whereas computers unified communication across the entire globe. This revolutionized many different forms of communication, but particularly the personal message.

The first email system able to send mail between people using different host computers was launched via the ARPANET in 1971, and it revolutionized personal messaging by enabling users to send electronic messages to distant recipients. The popularity of email has since skyrocketed, and it continues to be a widely-used means of personal messaging.

The advent of the Internet paved the way for communication through platforms and website portals like Yahoo!, and AOL. Instant messaging systems became popular in the late 1990s, including AOL Instant Messenger, ICQ, MSN Messenger and Yahoo! Messenger. As Internet communication links improved and personal computers became more capable, this functionality was merged into systems that also included voice and video communication, such as Skype (launched in 2003).

In 2008, Facebook announced Facebook Chat, which evolved into Facebook Messenger in 2011 and allows users to message each other via the Facebook site. Twitter followed suit and introduced direct messages to their site in 2013. Today, private messaging is a staple of established social media platforms such as Facebook and Twitter, as well as more recently-developed applications such as Viber and Hike.

Modern forms of private messaging may include multimedia messages, such as pictures or videos. The messaging app Snapchat allows users to exchange photo and video messages, which can be viewed for 1–10 seconds before they are deleted from Snapchat's servers.

Some common forms of private messaging include Facebook messaging (sometimes referred to as "inboxing"), Twitter direct messaging, and Instagram direct messaging. These forms of private messaging provide a private space on a usually public site. For instance, most activity on Twitter is public, but Twitter DMs provide a private space for communication between two users. This differs from mediums like email, texting, and Snapchat, where most or all activity is always private.

Private messaging has become increasingly popular in the workplace with the advent of the COVID-19 pandemic, which led to many businesses allowing employees to work from home. Private messaging enables distant employees to communicate in real-time as they would in a shared workspace.

Etiquette of private messages

There are unsaid, known rules that govern many interactions, but with technology and social media being relatively recent developments, the etiquette can sometimes be difficult to know, learn, or follow. One of the main issues of interactions over technology is that without body language, facial expressions, or tone of voice, conversations can be misunderstood.

Personal messaging etiquette can compensate for the lack of face-to-face conversation by exaggerating, communicating clearly, and not necessarily saying the same things that one may say in a face-to-face interaction that could be construed without body language, facial expressions, or tone of voice.

Privacy concerns

On Facebook 
In January 2014, Matthew Campbell and Michael Hurley filed a class-action lawsuit against Facebook for breaching the Electronic Communications Privacy Act. They alleged that the information in their supposedly private messages was being read and used to generate profit, specifically "for purposes including but not limited to data mining and user profiling".

In 2012, some Facebook users misinterpreted a redesign of the Facebook wall as publicly sharing private messages from 2008–2009. These were found to be public wall posts from those years, made at a time when it was not possible to like or comment on a wall post, making the notes look like private messages.

Phishing scams
In a popular phishing scheme, scammers will send emails with the subject-line "private message" which ask the victim to click a link to open the message. The link instead leads to a fake log-in page which asks the victim to enter their email username and password in order to view the "private message". Instead, the information goes straight to the "phishers", allowing them to hijack the email account.

References

Internet forum terminology
Social media
Software features